The Long Beach Fire Department of the city of Long Beach, California owns and operates Fireboats in Long Beach, providing fire protection and rescue services for the Port of Long Beach and the marina and beach areas of the city of Long Beach
Although administered separately, the port facilities of Los Angeles and Long Beach are adjacent, and together, form one of the largest container ports in the world.  
The cities of Los Angeles and Long Beach have a mutual aid arrangement where one will loan fireboats to the other in case of need.

Workboat magazine reported, on June 14, 2017, that Long Beach planned to spend $100 million USD to construct two new firestations for its two new fireboats.

See also
 Los Angeles Fire Department

References

Long Beach
Government in Long Beach, California